Marcadet–Poissonniers is a station of the Paris Métro, serving Line 4 and Line 12.

Previously, there were two stations. Marcadet on Line 4 (operated by the CMP) opened on 21 April 1908 as part of the first section of the line from Châtelet to Porte de Clignancourt. Poisonniers on Line 12 (then operated by the Nord-Sud Company as line A) opened on 23 August 1916 as part of the extension from Jules Joffrin to Porte de la Chapelle. When the CMP took over the Nord-Sud in 1930, both stations were joined with an underground corridor. The joined station opened on 25 August 1931 under its current name.  The name Marcadet is taken from the Rue Marcadet (from the Latin mercadus, "market"), which name appears on medieval maps, and from the Rue des Poissonniers, used since the Middle Ages by fishmongers (French: poissonniers) to bring fish from the North Sea to the markets at Les Halles.

Station layout

Gallery

References
Roland, Gérard (2003). Stations de métro. D’Abbesses à Wagram. Éditions Bonneton.

Paris Métro stations in the 18th arrondissement of Paris
Railway stations in France opened in 1908
Railway stations in France opened in 1916
Railway stations in France opened in 1931